Magic Mountain is a large long-lived hydrothermal vent field on the Southern Explorer Ridge, located about 150 miles west of Vancouver Island, British Columbia, Canada. Unlike most hydrothermal systems found in the Pacific Ocean, Magic Mountain is situated outside the Explorer Ridge. Its source is believed to rise along fault systems.

See also

References

Hydrothermal vents
Volcanism of British Columbia
Coast of British Columbia
Holocene volcanism 
Holocene North America
Quaternary British Columbia
Oceanography of Canada